The following are international rankings of Montenegro.

Economy

The Heritage Foundation/The Wall Street Journal Index of Economic Freedom 2010, ranked 68 out of 179

Media
Reporters Without Borders Worldwide Press Freedom Index 2009, ranked 77 out of 175

Politics

Transparency International Corruption Perceptions Index 2009, ranked 69 out of 180

Society

United Nations Development Programme Human Development Index 2009, ranked 65 out of 182

Technology
World Economic Forum Networked Readiness Index Networked Readiness Index 2008–2009, ranked 71 out of 134

Tourism

Transport

Other

References

Montenegro